The Aiguille de la Brenva is a remote rocky mountain peak in the Mont Blanc massif of the Alps. It lies wholly within Italy on a ridge descending south-east from the Tour Ronde. It has been described as "a spectacular fin with a fine E face".
It stands on a ridge separating the Entrèves glacier from the Brenva glacier, yet is somewhat overshadowed by its larger neighbours, such as the Aiguille Blanche and the Aiguille Noire de Peuterey. Nevertheless, it is a distinctive peak, offering a number of very challenging climbs, especially on its east face which consists of vertical granite flakes and cracks. On its northern side stands a distinctive, slender rock pinnacle about 60 metres high, known as the Père Eternel.
.

Climbing 
The Aiguille de la Brenva was first ascended on 25 August 1898 by A. Hess, L. Croux and C. Ollier via its south-east ridge. This remains the least difficult means of ascent to this day. (Graded PD on the French adjectival climbing scale). 

Nowadays, its east face offers a number of challenging climbing routes: the Donvito Diedre, the Bocallette route (UIAA Grade V/V+) (first established in 1935); the very hard  Bertone-Zappelli route, plus the 390m Rebuffat route (Grade V/V+), dating from 1948. The latter route is placed in 66th position by its first ascensionist, Gaston Rebuffat, in his classic mountaineering book "The Mont Blanc Massif - the 100 finest routes".

The peak's north ridge provides an exposed and strenuous 150m climb, which is rarely undertaken (Grade V/V+).

The  Père Eternel pinnacle  was first climbed in August 1927 by L. Grivel, O. Ortiz and A Pennard. (UIAA Grade V/V+).

Access 
The peak can be accessed from the Torino Hut via the Toule glacier to reach the Brèche de la Brenva. It can also be climbed as a "training exercise" in one day, reached direct from Courmayeur by means of a "stiff walk".

See also
Portal:Alps

References

External links
Aiguille de la Brenva on Google maps
 Climbing the Pềre Eternel (video)

Mountains of the Alps
Mont Blanc massif